Joseph Marchant (born 16 July 1996) is an English professional rugby union player who primarily plays centre for Harlequins in the Gallagher Premiership. He has also represented England at international level, having made his test debut against Wales during the 2019 Rugby World Cup warm-up matches. Marchant has previously played for clubs such as London Scottish and the Blues in the past.

Background 
Marchant was born on 16 July 1996 in Winchester. He began playing rugby at the age of 6. He studied at Peter Symonds College, taking a BTEC Extended Diploma in sport and was captain of the rugby side there. Marchant has also been schooled at Harestock and Henry Beaufort. He played for Winchester RFC as a school boy from 2002–12 and Symondians in 2013. He represented Hampshire rugby from u14-u18.

Marchant is also a blackbelt in Karate.

Club career 
Marchant joined the Harlequins academy in 2014 and made his club debut against the Newcastle Falcons in May 2015. On 10 November 2019, the Blues, Auckland's Super Rugby team, announced that they had signed Marchant on their Instagram account. It was confirmed via their own website that he would be playing with them as part of a sabbatical clause provided by Harlequins to further his international experience and possibility of an England call up. He featured in seven games and scored three tries.

In September 2020 he started for the Harlequins side that lost to Sale Sharks in the final of the Premiership Rugby Cup.

He scored two tries during Harlequins 43-36 defeat of Bristol Bears in the Premiership semi-final, a game in which Quins recovered from 28 points down to win. He started the following week in the Premiership final against Exeter. Harlequins won the game 40-38 in the highest scoring Premiership final ever.

In December 2022, Marchant agreed to join Top 14 side Stade Français for the 2023 season.

International career 
Marchant represented England U18 winning 14 caps and scoring one try. He has also represented England U20 scoring 59 points including ten tries. Marchant was a member of the side that won the 2015 Six Nations Under 20s Championship. At the 2016 World Rugby Under 20 Championship, Marchant scored in pool stage fixtures against Italy and Australia. He scored two tries in the final against Ireland. His impressive performances at junior level earned him a call-up to Eddie Jones' 45 man senior England training squad on 1 August 2016 and the following month saw him subsequently named in the Test squad for the Autumn Internationals.

On 20 April 2017 Marchant was one of 15 uncapped players named in the senior squad for their summer tour against Argentina but had to pull out due to injury. On 11 August 2019 Marchant made his Test debut as a second-half replacement for Jonathan Joseph in a World Cup warm-up match against Wales. The following month saw him score his first try on his first start in their final warm-up fixture against Italy at St James' Park. He was not selected for the 2019 Rugby World Cup.
 
After the World Cup Marchant gained another cap when he featured against Georgia in their opening fixture of the 2020 Autumn Nations Cup.

References

External links

 Harlequins Profile

1996 births
Living people
Blues (Super Rugby) players
England international rugby union players
English rugby union players
Harlequin F.C. players
People educated at Peter Symonds College
Rugby union centres
Rugby union players from Winchester